The 1925-26 Arkansas Razorbacks men's basketball team represented the University of Arkansas in the 1925-26 college basketball season. They played their home games in Schmidt Gymnasium in Fayetteville, Arkansas. It was Francis Schmidt's third year as head coach of the Hogs and the program's third season. The Hogs won their first conference championship in basketball, finishing with an 11-1 Southwest Conference record and a record of 23-2 overall.

Roster

Schedule and Results
Schedule retrieved from HogStats.com.

References

Arkansas Razorbacks
Arkansas Razorbacks men's basketball seasons